Long Meadow(s) or Long Meadow Farm may refer to:

United Kingdom
Long Meadow, Cambridgeshire

United States
Long Meadow Hill, a neighborhood in Brookfield, Connecticut
Long Meadows, a historic home near Hagerstown, Maryland
Longmeadow, Massachusetts
Longmeadow Historic District, Longmeadow, Massachusetts
Long Meadow Farm (Schwenksville, Pennsylvania), a historic home and barn in New Hanover Township, Montgomery County, Pennsylvania
 Long Meadow (Surgoinsville, Tennessee), a historic house in Hawkins County, Tennessee
 Long Meadow (Harrisonburg, Virginia), a historic home
 Long Meadow (Middletown, Virginia), a historic home
 Long Meadow (Winchester, Virginia), a historic home